Several countries in the Americas grant legal recognition to same-sex unions, with almost 85 percent of people in both North America and South America living in jurisdictions providing marriage rights to same-sex couples.

In North America, same-sex marriages are recognized and performed without restrictions in Canada, Costa Rica, Cuba, Mexico, and the United States.

Same-sex marriages are also performed in the Dutch territories of Bonaire, Sint Eustatius and Saba, the Danish autonomous territory of Greenland, and in all French overseas departments and collectivities (Guadeloupe, Martinique, Saint Barthélemy, Saint Martin and Saint Pierre and Miquelon). Furthermore, Aruba, Curaçao, and Sint Maarten recognize same-sex marriages performed in the Netherlands, and Aruba also performs registered partnerships. The British Territories of Bermuda and the Cayman Islands also perform civil partnerships.

In South America, same-sex marriages are recognized and performed without restrictions in Argentina, Brazil, Chile, Colombia, Ecuador and Uruguay as well as the jurisdictions of French Guiana, the Falkland Islands and South Georgia and the South Sandwich Islands. "Free unions" that are equivalent to marriage have begun to be recognized in Bolivia.

On 8 January 2018, the Inter-American Court of Human Rights (IACHR) ruled that the American Convention on Human Rights mandates and requires the legalization of same-sex marriage. The landmark ruling was fully binding on Costa Rica and set a binding precedent in the other signatory countries. The Court recommended that governments issue temporary decrees legalizing same-sex marriage until new legislation is brought in. The ruling applies to Barbados, Bolivia, Costa Rica, the Dominican Republic, Ecuador, El Salvador, Guatemala, Haiti, Honduras, Mexico, Nicaragua, Panama, Paraguay, Peru and Suriname.

Maps

Current situation

National level

Sub-national level

2018 Inter-American Court of Human Rights ruling
On 9 January 2018, the Inter-American Court of Human Rights issued an advisory opinion that states party to the American Convention on Human Rights must grant same-sex couples accession to all existing domestic legal systems of family registration, including marriage, along with all rights that derive from marriage. The opinion was issued after the Government of Costa Rica sought clarification of its obligations to LGBT people under the convention. The opinion sets precedent for all 23 member states, 19 of which did not recognize same-sex marriage at the time of the ruling: Barbados, Bolivia, Chile, Costa Rica, Dominica, the Dominican Republic, Ecuador, El Salvador, Guatemala, Grenada, Haiti, Honduras, Jamaica, Mexico, Nicaragua, Panama, Paraguay, Peru, and Suriname. Of these, all but Dominica, Grenada and Jamaica recognize the jurisdiction of the Court. However, states must each individually apply the ruling before it takes effect.

Future legislation

Marriage

Government proposals or proposals with a parliamentary majority 

 Venezuela: In October 2020, President Nicolás Maduro called on Congress to debate a same-sex marriage bill. On 24 February 2022, Vanessa Robertazzo, deputy of the opposition Cambiemos Movimiento Ciudadano party, introduced a same-sex marriage bill to the National Assembly.

Opposition proposals or proposals without a parliamentary majority 
 Aruba and Curaçao: The opposition Accion21 party introduced a bill to allow same-sex marriage in Parliament in June 2021. On 6 December 2022, the Joint Court of Justice of Aruba, Curaçao, and Sint Maarten ruled that the ban on same-sex marriage in Aruba and Curaçao was unlawful discrimination. The effect of the ruling is stayed pending appeal and cassation.

 Bolivia: The Minister of Justice and Institutional Transparency, Iván Lima, announced in mid-2021 that the Pluri-National Constitutional Court is considering the status of same-sex marriage.

 Honduras:  In May 2022, the deputy of the Libertad y Refundación Party, Manuel Rodríguez, presented a bill in congress to legalize same-sex marriage.

 British Overseas Territories: In July 2022, Labour Party Peer Lord Michael Cashman introduced a private member's bill in the House of Lords that would compel governors of each of the six British Overseas Territories where same-sex marriage is not currently legal (Anguilla, Bermuda, British Virgin Islands, Cayman Islands, Montserrat, and Turks and Caicos) to pass laws legalizing it. The territories are also bound by the European Convention on Human Rights to pass laws legalizing some form of same-sex union, although to date only Bermuda and Cayman Islands have done so.

Other forms of partnership

Opposition proposals or proposals without a parliamentary majority 
 Peru: Congressman Alejandro Cavero has introduced a bill to allow same-sex civil unions that will not allow adoption, but it has not been brought up for debate in the justice committee.

Public opinion

See also

LGBT rights in the Americas
Recognition of same-sex unions in Africa
Recognition of same-sex unions in Asia
Recognition of same-sex unions in Europe
Recognition of same-sex unions in Oceania
Same-sex marriage in tribal nations in the United States

Notes

References

LGBT-related lists
LGBT rights in the Americas
Americas